Iso Milovančev (1902 – 1968) was a Yugoslav wrestler. He competed in the men's Greco-Roman featherweight at the 1928 Summer Olympics.

References

External links
 

1902 births
1968 deaths
Yugoslav male sport wrestlers
Olympic wrestlers of Yugoslavia
Wrestlers at the 1928 Summer Olympics
Place of birth missing